Qoşaqovaq (also, Koshakovag and Kosha-Kovakh) is a village and municipality in the Agdash Rayon of Azerbaijan.  It has a population of 1,083.

References 

Populated places in Agdash District